Antenor Amable (born 2 June 1900, date of death unknown) was a Chilean footballer. He played in three matches for the Chile national football team in 1924. He was also part of Chile's squad for the 1924 South American Championship.

References

External links
 
 

1900 births
Year of death missing
Chilean footballers
Chile international footballers
Place of birth missing
Association football defenders
Ferroviarios footballers